Aleksandros Dhamo (born 14 August 1998) is an Albanian professional footballer who plays as a central midfielder.

Club career
Dhamo spent the 2018–19 season at Santarcangelo on loan from Cesena, and moved to the club after the demise of Cesena in summer 2018.

International career

References

1998 births
Living people
Footballers from Athens
Greek footballers
Association football midfielders
Albanian footballers
Albania youth international footballers
Santarcangelo Calcio players
AC Kajaani players
FC Codru Lozova players
Serie C players
Serie D players
Moldovan Super Liga players
Albanian expatriate footballers
Albanian expatriate sportspeople in Italy
Albanian expatriate sportspeople in Finland
Albanian expatriate sportspeople in Moldova
Expatriate footballers in Italy
Expatriate footballers in Finland
Expatriate footballers in Moldova